Nicola Veronica (1905-1979) a portrait artist, photograph engraver for The Chicago Tribune newspaper, and art instructor at Palette and Chisel Academy of Fine Art in Chicago, Illinois, was born 15 August 1905 in Italy, and died September 1979.  His last residence was the Chicago, Illinois area.  He was born as Nicholas Antonio Veronico, but later Americanized his name when he immigrated from Italy to America, arriving at Ellis Island, New York about 1920.

Artistic Awards

Nicola Veronica won numerous art awards during his lifetime, including:

The Palette and Chisel Academy of Fine Art Gold Medal Award for the years 1943 and 1974:

1943: The watercolor painting of the Goldenrod (showboat).

1974: The watercolor painting of "Mother".

The Palette and Chisel Academy of Fine Art Gold Star Award in 1943 for the watercolor painting of the Goldenrod (showboat).  From 1917 to 1969, only ten artists had been awarded that honor.

References

External links
 Palette & Chisel Official Website
This Old Palette blog site
Palette & Chisel Gold Medal Winners 1913-1987
 1943 Award-winning watercolor painting of the Goldenrod (showboat)
     "The Seaman" oil painting by Nicola Veronica
 Find A Grave website

American artist groups and collectives
Artist groups and collectives based in Chicago
1979 deaths
1905 births
Italian emigrants to the United States